Cadmus or Kadmos may refer to:

Ancient period
Cadmus, in Greek mythology the son of Agenor, king of Tyre and brother of Europa
Cadmus of Miletus, a 6th-century BC logographer
Mount Cadmus, a mountain in Asia Minor
Cadmus (river), the ancient name for the river that flowed from Mount Cadmus
Cadmus of Kos, tyrant of Zancle, son of Scythes
 Cadmus, a city in Syria, more often transliterated as Qadmus today
Kadmos (journal), a German journal, specialising in pre-Greek and early Greek epigraphy

Modern people
Paul Cadmus, an American artist
Cornelius A. Cadmus (1844-1902) an American Democratic Party politician from New Jersey
Thomas Cadmus (1736-1821), businessman, Revolutionary War officer and community leader in early Bloomfield, New Jersey.
Cadmus Wilcox, Confederate general

Other
Cadmus, Kansas, a community in the United States
Cadmus, Michigan, an unincorporated community
Project Cadmus, a fictional government organization in DC Comics
Cadmus (journal), an economic/humanitarian journal.
Cadmus (computer), a German Unix minicomputer brand in 1980s and 1990s build by Periphere Computer Systeme
, five ships of the Royal Navy
 merchant ship launched at Sunderland that made two whaling voyages (1827-1834) and that was lost in 1835
Cadmus (genus), a genus of leaf beetles

See also 

 Cadmos (disambiguation)